Alikadam may refer to:

Alikadam Cantonment, a cantonment located outside of Bandarban District
Alikadam Upazila, an upazila of Bandarban District